Chahardangeh (also Romanized as Chahārdangeh, Chahār Dangeh, and Chahār Dāngeh) is a city in, and the capital of, Chahardangeh District of Eslamshahr County, Tehran province, Iran. At the 2006 census, its population was 42,159 in 10,791 households. The following census in 2011 counted 46,299 people in 13,380 households. The latest census in 2016 showed a population of 49,950 people in 15,259 households.

References 

Eslamshahr County

Cities in Tehran Province

Populated places in Tehran Province

Populated places in Eslamshahr County